Shon Seung-wan (born February 21, 1994), known professionally as Wendy, is a South Korean singer, voice actress, radio host known for her work as a member of the South Korean girl group Red Velvet. In 2021, Wendy became the first Red Velvet member to debut solo with release the EP Like Water. In 2022, she became a member of SM's supergroup Got the Beat.

Aside of her music career, Wendy has appeared on television shows, being panelist on reality show We Got Married (2015–2016), Trick & True (2016–2017), being cast on comedy show Saturday Night Live Korea (2021), hosted on Mysterious Record Shop (2021). Additionally, Wendy is currently hosting radio program Wendy's Youngstreet (2021–present).

Life and career

1994–2014: Early life and career beginnings

Wendy was born on February 21, 1994, in Seongbuk-dong, a neighborhood in Seongbuk District in Seoul, South Korea. Coming from a family of music lovers, Wendy showed interest in becoming a singer when she was only six years old. Besides her passion for singing, she is also able to play several instruments, including the piano, guitar, flute, and saxophone.

She lived with her family in Jecheon until her fifth year of elementary school, when she moved to Canada with her older sister, Shon Seung-hee, to study abroad. She lived in Brockville, Ontario before moving to the United States to attend Shattuck-Saint Mary's in Faribault, Minnesota, where she was an honor student and athlete, and earned various awards for academics and music-related activities. There, she started using her English name 'Wendy Shon'. Returning to Canada, she later studied at Richmond Hill High School in Richmond Hill, Ontario, where she participated in the school's show choir called Vocal Fusion. While living in both countries, she became fluent in English and also learned to speak some French and Spanish.

Her parents were initially against her pursuing a career in music and wanted her to focus on her studies, but while she was still in high school, they eventually allowed her to audition to become a singer in South Korea.

In 2010, she submitted an online audition for Koreaboo's Global Auditions in 2011 with Cube Entertainment. Though she was not the final winner, she was one of fifteen finalists personally picked by Korean singer G.NA and Koreaboo from over 5,000 videos to continue to the final round in Vancouver, British Columbia, Canada, and open for G.NA's first solo showcase. In 2018, YG Entertainment founder Yang Hyun-suk revealed Wendy once auditioned for the company but was not accepted.

Wendy originally did not intend to audition for SM Entertainment, but was cast by the company when she accompanied a friend to the S.M. Global Audition in Canada in 2012. She recalled singing Kim Gun-mo's "Moon of Seoul" and passed. She trained for less than two years before she was introduced as a member of S.M. Entertainment's predebut group SM Rookies on March 14, 2014. As part of SM Rookies, Wendy released the song "Because I Love You" for the soundtrack of the Mnet drama Mimi and appeared in the song's music video.

On August 1, 2014, Wendy made her official debut as a member of Red Velvet.

2015–2020: Solo activities and hiatus

Wendy collaborated with rapper Yuk Jidam for the song "Return", which is part of the OST of KBS2's Who Are You: School 2015. The song was released on June 8, 2015, and debuted at number 31 on the Gaon Digital Chart. She released another song "Let You Know" for the soundtrack of the JTBC drama D-Day on October 16.

In January 2016, Wendy became a long-term panelist on We Got Married and participated in King of Mask Singer as a contestant under the alias "Space Beauty Maetel". In March 2016, she collaborated with Eric Nam on a duet titled "Spring Love", as part of SM Entertainment's SM Station project. The song peaked at number 7 on South Korea's Gaon Digital Chart. In July 2016, Wendy and her Red Velvet bandmate Seulgi released an original soundtrack titled "Don't Push Me" for the TV drama series Uncontrollably Fond. In October 2016, she became a fixed panelist for the KBS show Trick & True together with her bandmate Irene. In December 2016, Wendy participated in two other singles for the SM Station project, "Have Yourself a Merry Little Christmas", featuring pianist Moon Jung-jae and violinist Nile Lee, and "Sound of Your Heart", a collaboration with several SM Entertainment artists. In the same month, she was featured in the English version of Latin pop star Ricky Martin's single "Vente Pa' Ca".

Wendy released the song "I Can Only See You" with Seulgi in January 2017 for the OST of the KBS2 TV series, Hwarang. In February, she sang the Korean version of "My Time" which is part of Disney Channel's Elena of Avalor's official soundtrack and also appeared in its music video. In the same month, she became the host of the KBS World show K-Rush. On October 27, she, along with Kangta and Seulgi, released a remake of the 2001 song "인형 (Doll)" by Shinhwa's Shin Hye-sung and Lee Ji-hoon as part of the second season of the SM Station project. Its music video used footage from their live performance of the song at the SMTOWN LIVE TOUR V in JAPAN and was released on the same day. She released a duet with Baek A-yeon on December 2, called "The Little Match Girl". In February 2018, Wendy was chosen as the interactive holographic avatar of SK Telecom's new AI voice assistant speaker, 'Holobox'.

In June 2018, Wendy was announced filming in Austria with Seulgi for Battle Trip'''s special episode themed 'The Country I Want to Live in'.
In July 2018, Wendy collaborated with Yang Da-il for the single "One Summer" which was released on July 2. In October, it was announced that Wendy was set to release an English duet with American singer John Legend entitled "Written in the Stars" as part of the third season of SM Station, Station x 0 which would be Wendy's sixth time to participate in the project. The music video for the duet was released on October 19, 2018, on YouTube. In November 2018, Wendy released the song "Goodbye"  for the soundtrack of JTBC drama The Beauty Inside.

On February 22, 2019, Wendy released the solo soundtrack, "What If Love", for tvN's drama Touch Your Heart. In October, Wendy participated once again in King of Mask Singer, under the alias 'Green Witch'.

In March 2020, Wendy had her first public schedule since suffering an accident in December 2019, with an appearance on MBC Standard FM's Listen To Books. In the same month, Wendy was confirmed to take part as main voice actress for the Korean release of DreamWorks animated film Trolls: World Tour. It was released in April. In May 2020, Wendy collaborated with Zico for the OST of The King: Eternal Monarch titled "My Day Is Full Of You". In November 2020, aside from Red Velvet's OST "Future" for the drama Start-Up, Wendy also had a solo OST named "Two Words". In the same month, Wendy featured in labelmate Taemin's "Be Your Enemy", which was in included in his studio album Never Gonna Dance Again.

2021–present: Solo debut, radio DJ, and Got the Beat
In January 2021, Wendy made her official return to television as a co-host of Mysterious Record Shop. In March 2021, it was announced that Wendy would be making her debut as a solo artist with an album releasing in April. This was later confirmed as her first EP Like Water, which contains a total of five songs and was released on April 5.

On July 12, 2021, Wendy became the permanent nightly DJ host for SBS Power FM's radio show Wendy's Youngstreet'', where she had been a special DJ for in 2018.  On December 27, 2021, Wendy was revealed as a member of supergroup Got the Beat alongside Red Velvet groupmate Seulgi. The group debuted on January 3, 2022.

Other ventures

Endorsements
Aside from endorsements with Red Velvet as a group, Wendy, in November 2018, became an endorser of Dongwon Yangban Rice Porridge with Irene. On December 31, 2020, L'Occitane Korea launched their new campaign, 'Be Happy, Smile Again', with Wendy as a muse to commemorate the launch of their Happy Shea 2021 edition. Later in February 2021, they launched another campaign for the new Pink Essence product with Wendy. In March 2021, Wendy became the new presenter of Pond's.

Personal life

Stage incident and health
On December 25, 2019, Wendy was involved in a stage accident during her solo stage rehearsal at the 2019 SBS Gayo Daejeon. Her injuries included a pelvic fracture, a broken wrist and several facial injuries including a cracked cheekbone, with all injuries on the right side of her body. The accident and subsequent hospitalisation led to cancellation of all her planned activities. In February 2020, Wendy was discharged from hospital after spending two months recovering, and began outpatient treatment. She made her comeback on January 1, 2021, at SMTOWN Live Culture Humanity.

Discography

Extended plays

Singles

Soundtrack appearances

Other charted songs

Composition credits

Filmography

Film

Television drama

Television shows

Web shows

Radio shows

Music videos

Awards and nominations

Notes

References

External links

  
 
 SBS Radio: Wendy's Youngstreet 

1994 births
Living people
Singers from Seoul
21st-century South Korean women singers
K-pop singers
Red Velvet (group) members
SM Rookies members
South Korean dance musicians
South Korean women pop singers
South Korean female idols
South Korean television personalities
South Korean emigrants to Canada
South Korean singer-songwriters
South Korean women singer-songwriters
Japanese-language singers of South Korea